Paedarium is a genus of flies in the family Tachinidae.

Species
Paedarium neotropicum (Curran, 1926)
Paedarium parvum Aldrich, 1926
Paedarium punctipennis (Walker, 1858)

References

Dexiinae
Tachinidae genera
Diptera of South America
Diptera of North America
Taxa named by John Merton Aldrich